Claire Rose (born 23 May 1987) is a British professional racing cyclist, who last rode for UCI Women's Team .

Major results
2016
1st Round 3, Matrix Fitness Grand Prix Series – Stoke-on-Trent
2nd Time trial, National Road Championships
3rd Overall Tour de Bretagne Féminin (2.2) – France
3rd Ljubljana-Domzale-Ljubljana TT (1.2) – Slovenia

2017
1st  Time trial, National Road Championships
 Cascade Cycling Classic (2.2) – USA
1st Stages 2 (ITT) & 4
3rd Overall Joe Martin Stage Race (2.2) – USA 
 Redlands Classic – USA
1st Sprints classification
1st Stage 4

See also
 List of 2016 UCI Women's Teams and riders

References

External links
 

1987 births
Living people
British female cyclists
Place of birth missing (living people)
21st-century British women